Mali Popović is a village in the municipality of Jagodina, Serbia. According to the 2002 census, the village has a population of 445 people.

The architect Bogdan Bogdanović held a lecture course in an abandoned school in Mali Popović from 1976 to 1990.

References

Populated places in Pomoravlje District